GSK3B interacting protein is a protein that in humans is encoded by the GSKIP gene.

Function

This gene encodes a protein that is involved as a negative regulator of GSK3-beta in the Wnt signaling pathway. The encoded protein may play a role in the retinoic acid signaling pathway by regulating the functional interactions between GSK3-beta, beta-catenin and cyclin D1, and it regulates the beta-catenin/N-cadherin pool. The encoded protein contains a GSK3-beta interacting domain (GID) in its C-terminus, which is similar to the GID of Axin. The protein also contains an evolutionarily conserved RII-binding domain, which facilitates binding with protein kinase-A and GSK3-beta, enabling its role as an A-kinase anchoring protein. Alternatively spliced transcript variants have been observed for this gene.

References

Further reading